Gao Min may refer to:

Gao Min (diver) (born 1970), Chinese diver
Gao Min (cyclist) (born 1982), Chinese cyclist

See also
Gao (surname)